Steve Richardson (born December 23, 1954) is an American educator and politician.

Born in Des Moines, Iowa, Richardson graduated from Indianola high School in Indianola, Iowa in 1973. He received his bachelor's degree in history from Simpson College. He also took graduate work at University of Iowa and Northern Iowa University. He was a teacher and athletic director at the Woodward-Granger Schools. From 1990 to 1996 Richardson served on the Indianola City Council, and again from 2006 to 2010. From 1997 to 2002, Richardson served three terms in the Iowa House of Representatives as a Democrat.

Notes

1954 births
Living people
Politicians from Des Moines, Iowa
People from Warren County, Iowa
Simpson College alumni
University of Iowa alumni
University of Northern Iowa alumni
Educators from Iowa
Iowa city council members
Democratic Party members of the Iowa House of Representatives
20th-century American educators
20th-century American politicians
21st-century American politicians